Tchangmargarya multilabiata is a species of large operculate freshwater snail, an aquatic gastropod mollusk in the family Viviparidae, the river snails.

Distribution 
This species appear to be endemic to lakes in Stone Forest, e.g. Lake Changhu, Lake Yuehu and Lake Guangtangzi in Yunnan Province in the China.

Description 
Zhang et al. (2015) provided details about the shell and about the radula.

References

Viviparidae